Lizeth Yamile Mahecha Arévalo (December 6, 1970) is a Colombian lawyer and beauty queen who was Miss Colombia for 1989 and a contestant at the 1990 Miss Universe Pageant where she placed 2nd runner-up.

References

1970 births
Colombian beauty pageant winners
20th-century Colombian lawyers
Colombian women lawyers
Living people
Miss Universe 1990 contestants
21st-century Colombian lawyers